Dani Marie Watt (née Rhodes; born April 8, 1998) is an American professional soccer player who plays as a forward. She played college soccer for the University of Wisconsin–Madison.

Early life
Rhodes attended Waukesha West High School where she was a two time Wisconsin State girls Soccer Players of the Year.

College career
Rhodes played college soccer at Wisconsin from 2016 to 2019. She scored her first collegiate goal on August 19, 2016, against Illinois State. Rhodes was named to the All-Big Ten Freshman Team in 2016. In 2017, she was named to the All-Big Ten second team. In 2019, she was named Big Ten Forward of the Year, and was named to the All-Big Ten first team.

Club career

Chicago Red Stars
Rhodes made her NWSL debut for the Chicago Red Stars on September 12, 2020. She appeared in three out of Chicago's four matches during the 2020 Fall Series. before it was canceled due to the Coronavirus outbreak in the United States.

Þróttur Reykjavík
In July 2021, Rhodes signed with Þróttur Reykjavík of the Icelandic top-tier Úrvalsdeild kvenna. In her debut, she came on the 60th minute and scored Þróttur's third goal in its 4–0 victory against FH in the Icelandic Cup semi-finals.

Personal life
Rhodes is married to NFL linebacker T. J. Watt.

References

External links
 Wisconsin profile

1998 births
Living people
American women's soccer players
Women's association football forwards
Chicago Red Stars players
National Women's Soccer League players
Wisconsin Badgers women's soccer players
Úrvalsdeild kvenna (football) players